The Text of Festival is an archive album by Hawkwind consisting of BBC sessions and live performances between 1970 and 1971. It was originally released in 1983 after the band had exited their Active Records contract, and has continuously been repackaged and retitled ever since.

The copyright of the recordings on the first disc is owned by the BBC who were not approached for permission for their commercial use, so the legality of this album is questionable. The source tapes used are not from the BBC, but inferior-quality off-air recordings of the broadcast. The recordings have also appeared on The Weird Tapes, Hawkwind, Friends and Relations and Hawkwind Anthology.

Track listing

Side 1
"Master of the Universe" (Nik Turner, Dave Brock) – 6:00
"You Know You're Only Dreaming" (Brock) – 4:15
"You Shouldn't Do That" (Turner, Brock) – 5:52
"Hurry on Sundown" (Brock) – 6:20

Side 2
"Paranoia" (Hawkwind)"Seeing It As You Really Are" (Hawkwind) – 11:50
"We Do It" (Hawkwind) – 13:45

Side 3
"You Shouldn't Do That" (Hawkwind) – 21:35 [listed as "Sound, Shouldn't, Improvise"]

Side 4
"The Reason Is?" (Hawkwind) – 11:35"Be Yourself" (Hawkwind) – 5:51 [listed as "Improvise, Compromise, Reprise"]

Personnel
Dave Brock - guitar, vocals
Nik Turner - saxophone, flute, vocals
Huw Lloyd-Langton - guitar (track 4)
Thomas Crimble - bass guitar (tracks 4-6 and disc 2)
Dave Anderson - bass guitar (tracks 1-3)
Dik Mik Davies - Synthesizer
Terry Ollis - drums

Notes
"Come Home" is listed on the album following "We Do It", but has never been included on any of the releases of this album. It does appear on the Hawkwind Anthology compilation set.
"The Reason Is?" and "Be Yourself" have never be issued on any of the CD versions.
Later releases erroneously claim that this recording is from the Cambridge Corn Exchange. There is a recording in existence from The Six Hour Technicolor Dream featuring Hawkwind, Pink Fairies and Syd Barrett at the Cambridge Corn Exchange on 27-Jan-1972, the Hawkwind portion of which was released in 2011 as Leave No Star Unturned (see Discogs entry).
Sources
Track 1-3: Maida Vale, London, 19-May-1971; Broadcast: Sounds of the Seventies, 27-May-1971 (with Wishbone Ash) & 24-Jun-1971 (with Cochise).
Track 4: Maida Vale, 18-Aug-1970; Broadcast: Top Gear, 19-Sep-1970. Tracks originally broadcast from this session: "Hurry on Sundown", "Seeing It As You Really Are" and "Some of That Stuff" [aka "Come Home"].
Track 5-6: Paris Cinema, London, 5-Nov-1970; Broadcast: John Peel Sunday Concert, 15-Nov-1970.
Disc 2: Recorded at Colchester Technical College, 19-Feb-1971 (with Uriah Heep).
Credits
Cover art by John Coulthart.
The album title is a reference to the debut novel by Mick Farren.

Release history

References

BBC Radio recordings
Hawkwind compilation albums
Hawkwind live albums
1983 live albums
1983 compilation albums